The Masonic Temple is a historic commercial and fraternal society building at 415 Congress Street in downtown Portland, Maine.  Built in 1911 to a design by local architect Frederick A. Tompson, it is one of the city's finest examples of Beaux Arts architecture, and houses some of the state's grandest interior spaces.  It was listed on the National Register of Historic Places in 1982.

Description and history
The Portland Masonic Temple occupies a prominent position in the city's downtown, set between City Hall and the First Parish Church on the north side of Congress Street, the city's main commercial thoroughfare.  It is a brick and stone building, six stories in height, with a flat roof.  Its main facade is divided into five sections, with four storefronts flanking a central two-story entrance.  The entrance has wide paneled pilasters on either side, and a round-arch window at the second level.  A beltcourse frieze with ornate decorate stonework separates the second and third levels.  The middle three bays of the third through fifth floors are recessed, with flanking Corinthian pilasters and paired Corinthian columns on either side of the central bay.

The Grand Lodge of Maine was established in 1820, although its oldest lodge was founded in 1762, with a charter signed by Paul Revere and others.  This building has been the principal center of Masonic activity in the state since its construction in 1911.  The Masons put the building up for sale in 2008, citing the high cost of its maintenance, but a deal to convert the building to condominiums fell through.  They have now opened their spaces, which include some of the finest large spaces in the city, for event rental as a means to support its upkeep.

See also
National Register of Historic Places listings in Portland, Maine

References

External links
The Portland Masonic web site

Clubhouses on the National Register of Historic Places in Maine
Beaux-Arts architecture in Maine
Masonic buildings completed in 1911
Buildings and structures in Portland, Maine
Masonic buildings in Maine
National Register of Historic Places in Portland, Maine